Homocline may refer to:

Geology
Homocline, a type of geological structure

Geomorphology
Homoclinal ridge, one of a number of topographic features (landforms) created by the erosion of tilted strata, i.e. a homocline

Mathematics
Homoclinic orbit
Homoclinic bifurcation